Gjesværstappan is a group of high, steep-sided, grass-covered islands which are located north of the island village of Gjesvær in Nordkapp Municipality in Troms og Finnmark county, Norway. The three main islands are Storstappen, Kjerkestappen, and Bukkstappen.

Historically, there were people that lived on the islands and there was a church on Kjerkestappen.

Nature reserve
The islands contain a large colony of seabirds and have been designated a nature reserve since 1983, as well as being an Important Bird Area (IBA).
The largest colonies of cliff-breeding seabirds are mainly located on the bird cliffs of the biggest island, Storstappen,  and between June 15 and August 15 visitors are not allowed to set foot on this island.

The colony is regarded as important because of the large numbers of birds. A 1988 survey found 70 pairs of great cormorants, around 50 pairs of European shags, 5000 to 10,000 pairs of black-legged kittiwakes, about 600 pairs of common murres, 25 pairs of thick-billed murres, about 2500 pairs of razorbills and about 50,000 pairs of Atlantic puffins. The 1988 survey also found northern gannet nests.

Media gallery

References

Nordkapp
Islands of Troms og Finnmark
Nature reserves in Norway
Important Bird Areas of Norway
Important Bird Areas of Arctic islands
Seabird colonies